The 2006 Boston College Eagles football team represented Boston College during the 2006 NCAA Division I FBS football season. Boston College competed as a member of the Atlantic Coast Conference. The Eagles played their home games at Alumni Stadium in Chestnut Hill, Massachusetts, which has been their home stadium since 1957.

Schedule

Rankings

Drafted Players (2007 NFL Draft)

References

Boston College
Boston College Eagles football seasons
Duke's Mayo Bowl champion seasons
Boston College Eagles football
Boston College Eagles football